William Cooper (24 October 1909 – 18 May 1994) was a professional footballer who played as a full back for Aberdeen, his only club at the professional level.

Cooper played junior football with Mugiemoss before starting his professional career with Aberdeen in 1927. He played almost 400 official games for the club in a 20-year career which was temporarily halted by the Second World War in 1939 (he also made over 180 appearances in the unofficial regional competitions held during the conflict, several of which were won by the Dons, culminating in the nationwide 1946 Southern League Cup Final which his team won before a crowd of 135,000 at Hampden Park). After regular competitions resumed, Cooper played a large part in Aberdeen's 1946–47 Scottish Cup run but missed the final through injury; the Scottish Football Association gave Aberdeen permission to award him a winners' medal, despite him not playing on the day. He had also collected runners-up medals from the Scottish Cup in 1937, and the Scottish League Cup in 1947.

He represented the Scottish League XI twice, before the war.

Career statistics

Club 
Appearances and goals by club, season and competition

*Games played before league season was suspended

Honours 
Aberdeen
 Scottish Cup: 1947
Runner-up: 1937

References

External links 
Aberdeen players, Neil Brown

1909 births
1994 deaths
Footballers from Aberdeen
Aberdeen F.C. players
Dyce Juniors F.C. players
Association football fullbacks
Scottish Football League players
Scottish Junior Football Association players
Highland Football League players
Scottish Football League representative players
Scottish footballers
Huntly F.C. players